Ilia Volok (Russian: Илья Волох) (Ukrainian: Ілля Волох) (November 22) is a Ukrainian-born American actor. He has appeared in over 170 films, television shows, and video games.

Career
Volok has appeared in more than 90 films and television programs. He starred as Vladimir Krasin in Air Force One and portrayed Master Org in Power Rangers Wild Force. Additionally, he has had recurring roles in General Hospital and The Young and the Restless. He guest starred in an episode of Friends in which reference was made to Air Force One without mentioning him as one of its actors.

Volok frequently performs on stage. He co-wrote, co-created, and starred as the title character in the comedy play Fakov in America. He plays a leading part in Cat's Paw, an Actors Studio project. In Diary of a Madman by short story Nikolai Gogol. The character Vladimir Kamarivsky in the Electronic Arts video game Battlefield 3 is modeled after and voiced by Volok.

Filmography

Hail Caesar (1994) .... Wlad
Midnight Man (1995) .... Slav
Police Story 4: First Strike (1996) .... Russian Group #9
Executive Decision (1996) .... Chechen Thug
Air Force One (1997) .... Vladimir Krasin
U Turn (1997) .... Sergi 
Plan B (1997) .... 'Flash'
Best of The Best 4: Without Warning (1998) .... Ilia
One Man's Hero (1999) .... Daniel Grzbalski
Kolobos (1999) .... Faceless
Night All Day (2000) .... Karloff
Camera Obscura (2000) .... Taxi Driver
Shadow Hours (2000) .... Russian
Between Christmas and New Year's (2000) .... Ilia
Monkeybone (2001) .... Rasputin
Swordfish (2001) .... Gabriel's Crew
The Quickie (2001) .... Slava
Power Rangers Wild Force (2002, TV Series) .... Reincarnated Master Org / Dr. Viktor Adler
Firefly (2002, TV Series, 1 episode) .... Marco
Boris (2002, Short) .... Yuri
Judging Amy (2002, TV Series, 1 episode) .... Trajan Popovici
Six Feet Under (2002, TV Series, 2 episodes) .... Yuri
The King of Queens (2003, TV Series, 1 episode) .... Andrei
Monk (2003, TV Series, 1 episode) .... Nikolai Petroff
Spinning Boris (2003) .... Elvis Impersonator
The D.A. (2004, TV Series, 1 episode) .... Davonovich
Alias (2003–2005, TV Series, 2 episodes) .... Ushek San'ko
Commander in Chief (2005, TV Series, 1 episode) .... Dmitri Kharkov
The Unit (1 episode, 2006, TV Series) .... Deputy Grubo
CSI: NY (2006, TV Series, 1 episode) .... Gabe
Domestic Import (2006) .... Sasha
Company Town (2006, TV Movie) .... Yuri
The Young and the Restless (2007, TV Series) .... Milan
The Wedding Bells (2007, TV Series, 1 episode) .... Wolfie
Burn Notice (2007, TV Series, 1 episode) .... Jan Haseck
The Red Chalk (2007, Short) .... Young Stalin
Charlie Wilson's War (2007) .... Russian Helicopter Pilot
1% (2008, TV) .... Russian Ranger #1
Las Vegas (2008,  TV Series, 1 episode) .... Rudy Vinovich
Indiana Jones and the Kingdom of the Crystal Skull (2008) .... Russian Suit #2 
Primo (2008) .... Egor Denko
Identity Crisis (2008) .... Drunken Russian
La-La Loco Baby (2008) .... Kazimir
The Curious Case of Benjamin Button (2008) .... Russian Interpreter
Worst Week (2008, TV Series, 1 episode) .... Vanya
 Hired Gun (2009) .... Yegor
Without a Trace (2009, TV Series, 1 episode) .... Yuri
The Soloist (2009) .... Harry Barnoff
Rogue Warrior (2009, Video Game) .... Russian 1
Treasure of the Black Jaguar (2010) .... Gregor
Cielito Lindo (2010) .... Borowski
The Bad Penny (2011) .... Terry Rubelev
Water for Elephants (2011) .... Mr. Jankowski
Abduction (2011) .... Sweater
Battlefield 3 (2011, Video Game) - Vladimir Kamarivsky (voice)
Mission: Impossible – Ghost Protocol (2011) .... Fog
G.I. Joe: Retaliation (2013) .... Russian Leader
The Immigrant (2013) .... Wojtek Bistricky
Payday 2 (2013, Video Game) .... Vlad
Marvel's Agents of S.H.I.E.L.D. (2014, TV Series) .... Vladimir
The Last Ship (2014, TV Series) .... Dmitri Belenko
Pawn Sacrifice (2014) .... KGB Guy
How to Be a Gangster in America (2015) .... Dimitri
Taking Liberty (2016) .... Boss
Finding Mother (2017) .... Uncle Borya
Prey (2017, Video Game) .... Luka Golubkin (voice)
Hunter Killer (2018) .... Capt. Vlade Sutrev
Magnum P.I. (2019, TV Series, 1 Episode) …. Sergei
The Punisher (2019, TV Series, 1 Episode) .... Kazan

References

External links

Official site

Ukrainian male film actors
Ukrainian male television actors
Ukrainian male stage actors
Living people
Year of birth missing (living people)